The Sopó Archangels  is a famous collection of oil paintings from the Colombian colonial period which is located in the Church of the Divine Savior in the Colombian municipality of Sopó.

This art collection  has an important historic value.  The Archangels  are believed to be  painted around 1650, but the artist remains unknown.  Some art experts believe that the paintings are from Baltasar de Figueroa, others point to the Ecuadorian  painter Miguel de Santiago. A third theory indicates the Bogotan painter Bernabe de Posadas.  

The national Ministry of Culture and the Board of Colonial Art developed a restoration program for the pieces, which have various degrees of damage. Twelve canvas of 2.38 x 1.67 meters depict eleven archangels, plus the Guardian Angel. Each piece contains the Hebraic name of the angel and the Spanish language description:

See also
Ángeles arcabuceros

References

Official website: https://web.archive.org/web/20100611082947/http://www.elhablador.net/arcangeles-de-sopo.html (Spanish)
banrepcultural.org

Archangels
Colombian art
History of Colombia 
Catholic paintings
Angels in Christianity
Angels in art
Spanish Baroque